Jonathan Erlich and Divij Sharan were the defending champions but chose not to defend their title.

Marcelo Demoliner and Hugo Nys won the title after defeating André Göransson and Sem Verbeek 3–6, 6–4, [10–3] in the final.

Seeds

Draw

References

External links
 Main draw

Canberra Challenger - Doubles